Archibald Rigg (18 April 1865 – 2 September 1918) was a New Zealand cricketer. He played in one first-class match for Wellington in 1884/85.

See also
 List of Wellington representative cricketers

References

External links
 

1865 births
1918 deaths
New Zealand cricketers
Wellington cricketers
Cricketers from Wellington City